Shōnai Station (庄内駅) is the name of two train stations in Japan:

 Shōnai Station (Ōita)
 Shōnai Station (Osaka)

See also
 Shōnai-dōri Station
 Chikuzen-Shōnai Station
 Shōnai Ryokuchi Kōen Station